Qarwaqucha (Quechua qarwa yellowish, qucha lake, hispanicized spelling Carhuacocha) is a lake in Peru located in the Junín Region, Jauja Province, Canchayllo District. It lies southeast of the peaks of Tunshu and Tukumach'ay and west of a lake named Wayllakancha (Huayllacancha). It belongs to the watershed of the Mantaro River.

The Qarwaqucha dam was built in 1995. It was constructed by GUICONSA and is operated by Electroperú S.A.

See also
List of lakes in Peru

References

Lakes of Peru
Lakes of Junín Region
Dams in Peru
Buildings and structures in Junín Region